Mundus or Mundo (died 536) was a Barbarian commander of Gepid, Hun, and/or Gothic origins. He appears to have been the son of the Gepid king Giesmus. In the early 500s he commanded a group of bandits in Pannonia, eventually allying himself to the Ostrogothic king Theodoric the Great. After Theodoric's death in 526, Mundus entered Byzantine service under emperor Justinian I, fighting in the Balkans, defending Justinian during the Nika riots, and fighting in the first stage of the Gothic War, during which he died in 536.

Etymology
The differences between the Greek and Latin names are unusual and Gerhard Doerfer suspects that the Greek name has been partially Hellenized.

Omeljan Pritsak argues that Mundus's name had the same Turkic etymology as proposed by Gyula Németh and László Rásonyi for Attila's father Mundzuk, from Turkic *munʒu (jewel, pearl; flag). Pritsak also argues that Mundus's father, Giesmus, had a name  derived ultimately from the Turkic–Mongolian root kes/käs (protector, bestower of favor, blessing, good-fortune).

Otto Maenchen-Helfen, however, takes Giesmus for a Germanic name and in this connection notes Moritz Schönfeld's Germanic etymology of Mundus, comparing it to the Germanic names Mundila and Munderic, both derived from PGmc *munda ("protection). Stefan Krautschik likewise argues that the Germanic name of Mundus's grandson Theudimund speaks for a Germanic etymology. Gottfried Schramm rejects a Germanic origin, arguing that an original East Germanic name would have appeared as *Munda in Jordanes. However, Gudmund Schütte notes other East Germanic names recorded as ending in -o rather than -a, such as Veduco and Tremo, and proposed interference in the Latin transcription from another Germanic dialect.

Ethnic identity
Different ancient authors give different indications of Mundus's ethnic identity. Jordanes identifies Mundus as "formerly of the Attilani," that is, the Huns (Jord. Get. 301), whereas John Malalas (chap. 450) and Theophanes the Confessor (A.M. 6032) identify Mundus as the son of a king of the Gepids.

The Prosopography of the Later Roman Empire has argued that because Mundo (Jordanes) has Hunnic origins and Mundus has Gepid origins, they cannot be the same person, an argument rejected by Patrick Amory and Stefan Krautschik. Brian Croke argued that Jordanes's statement could also mean that Mundus originated in the confederacy of the Huns rather than that he was a Hun himself. Stefan Krautschik instead argues that the Gepid royal family and Attila's were likely connected by marriage. According to Amory, Mundus could have had ancestors who thought of themselves as Goths, Gepids, or Huns, from among which he and others could have chosen as needed.

Biography 
According to Theophanes, Mundus was the son of Giesmus, a ruler of the East Germanic tribe Gepids with his capital in Sirmium, and nephew to another Gepid ruler, Thraustila. After his father's death, Mundus was raised by his maternal uncle Thraustila, who likely succeeded Giesmus. Thraustila was killed in battle in 488 by the forces of Theodoric the Great. After Thraustila was succeeded by his son Traseric, Mundus came to lead a group of bandits in Pannonia. He declared himself a king and established himself in a tower called Herta. When the Byzantines sent an army to fight him under the general Sabinianus in 505, Theodoric sent his general Pitzias and he and Mundus joined forces and defeated Sabinianus. Although he disappears from the sources, Mundus appears to have remained Theodoric's ally until the latter's death in 526.

Mundus is next mentioned as a commander of the Gepids and Heruli in Pannonia in the 520s. In 529, in the context of new battles between the Gepids and Byzantines, Mundus and his son Mauricius entered Byzantine service and was made magister militum in Illyricum by the Byzantine emperor Justinian I, where he fought against the Slavs and Bulgars. In 531, he replaced Belisarius as magister militum per Orientem before re-assuming his rank of Magister militum per Illyricum again in 532. In that same year, Mundus and a troop of Heruli happened to be in Constinople when the Nika riots broke out; he successfully suppressed the riots with Belisarius, with his troops massacring many near the hippodrome. In 535, with the outbreak of the Gothic War, Mundus was sent to Dalmatia and conquered the city of Salona (Split) from the Goths. In 536, his son Mauricius was killed during a Gothic counterattack; Mundus subsequently thoroughly defeated the Goths, but was killed while pursuing them.

Notes

References

Bibliography

Primary sources

 Procopius, De Bello Persico, Volume I., De Bello Gothico, Volume I. (Project Gutenberg)
 John Malalas, Chronographia
 Theophanes the Confessor, Chronicle
 Marcellinus Comes, Chronicon

Secondary sources

 

 
 

 

536 deaths
6th-century Byzantine military personnel
Byzantines killed in battle
Byzantine people of Hunnic descent
Generals of Justinian I
Gepid warriors
History of Dalmatia
Magistri militum of Hunnic descent
People of the Gothic War (535–554)
Year of birth unknown